Holden, officially GM Holden Ltd was the Australian subsidiary of General Motors (GM), the world’s second largest automaker.

Holden vehicles, in addition to nameplate, are designated by a series code. For example, the 1971–1974 Holden Kingswood has been assigned the series code "HQ", and the 2002–2004 Holden Commodore, "VY". Often these series codes are not arbitrary. In the case of the VY above, the "V" stands for the GM V platform that underpins it. The letter "Y" is not however significant; it is simply a logical successor to the previous "VX" Commodore model. Meaning can be found in other codes. The TX Gemini and MB Barina for example, where the "T" and the "M" denote the GM T and M platforms that underpin each vehicle, respectively. While the majority of Holden cars follow this double-letter format (not necessarily based on platform), anomalies exist. The "V2" code applies to the 2001–2004 Holden Monaro, with "V" indicating the V platform architecture and the "2" possibly referring to its two-door body style. Similarly, the 1998–2001 Holden Suburban designated "K8". The three-letter codes assigned to the WFR series Holden Shuttle and UBS Jackaroo are the remaining incongruous designations. These codes are simply those carried over from the original Isuzu models that the Shuttle and Jackaroo derive from.

The VY series of Holdens were not restricted to the Commodore; VY Berlina and Calais cars were also marketed. All three are essentially identical, except in terms of level of equipment and luxury and have therefore been separated using different nameplates. Holden’s record of separating fundamentally identical cars by nameplate to occupy different niches applies mainly to their locally made "large" cars, for example, the Holden Belmont/Kingswood/Premier, Commodore/Berlina/Calais and Statesman/Caprice. Derivative versions with unique body styles, like the Monaro coupe often share the series code with their donor model. Outside of "large" cars, the only other Holdens to have operated in a similar manner are the UBS Jackaroo/Monterey twins and the LX and UC Sunbird/Torana. Generally, only the "large" Holdens are referred to by series code, thus this list is confined to listing only these models. List of Holden vehicles by nameplate covers these excluded cars, with the "large" Holden models occupying both lists.

First generation (1948–1956) 

^ Table of contents

Second generation (1956–1960) 

^ Table of contents

Third generation (1960–1962) 

^ Table of contents

Fourth generation (1962–1965) 

^ Table of contents

Fifth generation (1965–1968) 

^ Table of contents

Sixth generation (1968–1971) 

^ Table of contents

Seventh generation (1971–1984) 

^ Table of contents

Eighth generation (1978–1988) 

^ Table of contents

Ninth generation (1988–2000) 

^ Table of contents

Tenth generation (1997–2007) 

^ Table of contents

Eleventh generation (2006–2013) 

^ Table of contents

References

Notes

Citations

Bibliography 

 

Holden